M/V Burns Harbor is a very large diesel-powered Lake freighter owned and operated by the American Steamship Company. This vessel was built in 1980 at Bay Shipbuilding Company, Sturgeon Bay, Wisconsin and included self-unloading technology.

The ship is 1000 feet long and 105 feet wide, with a carrying capacity of 80,900 deadweight tons at midsummer draft, either coal or iron ore.

History 
The ship was built for Bethlehem Steel and named for their steel mill in Burns Harbor, Indiana. Burns Harbor made its first voyage September 28, 1980 to on-load iron ore in Superior, Wisconsin. American Steamship Company acquired Burns Harbor in 2005.
The ship belongs to the same class as fleet mates Walter J McCarthy Jr, Indiana Harbor, American Integrity, and American Century, however Burns Harbor features an extra deck on the aft superstructure, which differentiates it.

References 

1980 ships
Great Lakes freighters